The Night Crew is an American action horror thriller film directed by Christian Sesma and co-written by Paul Sloan and Sesma. The film stars Danny Trejo, Luke Goss, Bokeem Woodbine and Chasty Ballesteros.

Plot 
The Night Crew centers on a group of hard up bounty hunters (Wade, Ronnie, Rose and Crenshaw) who are paid to rescue a mysterious girl and bring her to America to hide and expose the illegal activities by the most powerful drug dealer.  They must survive the night in a desert motel against their well trained gang. They soon realize that their fugitive, a mysterious Chinese woman (Mae), is much more than she lets on.

Cast 

 Luke Goss
 Bokeem Woodbine
 Chasty Ballesteros
 Jason Mewes
 Bruna Rubio

Production 
The filming began on December 2, 2013 for an eighteen days of shooting in Coachella Valley, California with mostly filming in Desert Hot Springs. On January 16, 2014, Deadline reported that the principal photography had begun in Palm Springs after new year holidays.

References

External links 
 

2015 action thriller films
American action thriller films
2015 films
2015 directorial debut films
2010s English-language films
2010s American films